Tanyaporn Prucksakorn is a Thai sport shooter who has competed at the 2008, 2012 and 2016 Summer Olympics. At all three Olympics, she competed in the 10 m air pistol and 25 m pistol events.  She has been a competitive shooter since 2003, winning two World Cup silver medals, both at the Munich event (40 m air pistol in 2012 and 25 m pistol in 2015).

References

Tanyaporn Prucksakorn
Living people
Tanyaporn Prucksakorn
Shooters at the 2008 Summer Olympics
Shooters at the 2012 Summer Olympics
Shooters at the 2006 Asian Games
Shooters at the 2010 Asian Games
Shooters at the 2016 Summer Olympics
Universiade medalists in shooting
Tanyaporn Prucksakorn
Tanyaporn Prucksakorn
Southeast Asian Games medalists in shooting
Shooters at the 2018 Asian Games
Competitors at the 2007 Southeast Asian Games
Universiade gold medalists for Thailand
Universiade silver medalists for Thailand
Tanyaporn Prucksakorn
1990 births
Medalists at the 2011 Summer Universiade
Medalists at the 2013 Summer Universiade
Medalists at the 2015 Summer Universiade
Shooters at the 2020 Summer Olympics
Tanyaporn Prucksakorn